In statistics and signal processing, the orthogonality principle is a necessary and sufficient condition for the optimality of a Bayesian estimator. Loosely stated, the orthogonality principle says that the error vector of the optimal estimator (in a mean square error sense) is orthogonal to any possible estimator. The orthogonality principle is most commonly stated for linear estimators, but more general formulations are possible. Since the principle is a necessary and sufficient condition for optimality, it can be used to find the minimum mean square error estimator.

Orthogonality principle for linear estimators 

The orthogonality principle is most commonly used in the setting of linear estimation. In this context, let x be an unknown random vector which is to be estimated based on the observation vector y. One wishes to construct a linear estimator  for some matrix H and vector c. Then, the orthogonality principle states that an estimator  achieves minimum mean square error if and only if
  and
 
If x and y have zero mean, then it suffices to require the first condition.

Example 
Suppose x is a Gaussian random variable with mean m and variance  Also suppose we observe a value  where w is Gaussian noise which is independent of x and has mean 0 and variance  We wish to find a linear estimator  minimizing the MSE. Substituting the expression  into the two requirements of the orthogonality principle, we obtain
 
 
 
and
 
 
 
Solving these two linear equations for h and c results in
 
so that the linear minimum mean square error estimator is given by
 

This estimator can be interpreted as a weighted average between the noisy measurements y and the prior expected value m. If the noise variance  is low compared with the variance of the prior   (corresponding to a high SNR), then most of the weight is given to the measurements y, which are deemed more reliable than the prior information. Conversely, if the noise variance is relatively higher, then the estimate will be close to m, as the measurements are not reliable enough to outweigh the prior information.

Finally, note that because the variables x and y are jointly Gaussian, the minimum MSE estimator is linear. Therefore, in this case, the estimator above minimizes the MSE among all estimators, not only linear estimators.

General formulation 
One wishes to find a vector  which will approximate a vector .

Other settings which can be formulated in this way include the subspace of causal linear filters and the subspace of all (possibly nonlinear) estimators.

Geometrically, we can see this problem by the following simple case where  is a one-dimensional subspace:

We want to find the closest approximation to the vector  by a vector  in the space . From the geometric interpretation, it is intuitive that the best approximation, or smallest error, occurs when the error vector, is orthogonal to vectors in the space . 

Stated in such a manner, this principle is simply a statement of the Hilbert projection theorem. Nevertheless, the extensive use of this result in signal processing has resulted in the name "orthogonality principle."

A solution to error minimization problems 

The following is one way to find the minimum mean square error estimator by using the orthogonality principle.

We want to be able to approximate a vector  by 

 

where

 

By the orthogonality theorem, the square norm of the error vector, is minimized when, for all j,

 

Developing this equation, we obtain

  

If there is a finite number  of vectors , one can write this equation in matrix form as

 

 

thus providing an expression for the coefficients  of the minimum mean square error estimator.

See also
Minimum mean square error
Hilbert projection theorem

Notes

References 
 
 

Bayesian estimation
Statistical principles